The cabinet of Artur Văitoianu was the government of Romania from 27 September to 30 November 1919.

Ministers
The ministers of the cabinet were as follows:

President of the Council of Ministers:
Gen. Artur Văitoianu (27 September - 30 November 1919)
Minister of the Interior: 
Gen. Artur Văitoianu (27 September - 30 November 1919)
Minister of Foreign Affairs: 
(interim) Gen. Artur Văitoianu (27 September - 15 October 1919)
Nicolae Mișu (15 October - 30 November 1919)
Minister of Finance:
(interim) Gen. Ioan Popescu (27 September - 6 October 1919)
Ion Angelescu (6 October - 30 November 1919)
Minister of Justice:
Emanuil Miclescu (27 September - 30 November 1919)
Minister of Religious Affairs and Public Instruction:
Gen. Alexandru Lupescu (27 September - 30 November 1919)
Minister of War:
Gen. Ioan Rășcanu (27 September - 30 November 1919)
Minister of Public Works:
Gen. Ștefan Mihail (27 September - 30 November 1919)
Minister of Industry and Commerce:
Gen. Ioan Popescu (27 September - 30 November 1919)
Minister of Agriculture and Property:
Gen. Ioan Popovici (27 September - 30 November 1919)

Ministers without portfolio (for Bessarabia):
Ion Inculeț (27 September - 30 November 1919)
Daniel Ciugureanu (27 September - 30 November 1919)

Ministers without portfolio (for Bukovina):
Ion Nistor (27 September - 30 November 1919)

Ministers without portfolio (for Transylvania):
Alexandru Vaida-Voievod (27 September - 30 November 1919)
Vasile Goldiș (27 September - 30 November 1919)
Ștefan Cicio Pop (27 September - 30 November 1919)

References

Cabinets of Romania
Cabinets established in 1919
Cabinets disestablished in 1919
1919 establishments in Romania
1919 disestablishments in Romania